New Malaysian Essays is an annual Malaysian non-fiction book series by Matahari Books. It showcases previously unpublished essays on a variety of styles, from polemic to ode to memoir. Each book is mainly in English but will contain at least one essay in Malay.

Vol 1 

Vol 1  was launched in February 2008 in Kuala Lumpur. edited by Amir Muhammad and featured six writers. They are, in order of appearance in the book:
 Brian Yap's The Trouble with Malaysia, an election-era critique.
 Aminuddin Mahmud's Branding -Mamak Style, business tips from popular eateries.
 Burhan Baki's Yes We Must Move On: Theoretical Notes on Various Things Malaysian, a post-structuralist reading of local icons and conduct.
 Saharil Hasrin Sanin's Teroris Bahasa (in Malay)  about the evolution and political neglect of language.
 Amir Muhammad's Unwelcome Words, a mini-dictionary of words not found in the official lexicon.
 Sonia Randhawa's A Manifesto for Independence: Fifty Years to Merdeka?, a prescription for the future that is inspired by anarchism. 
The cover features a detail from a painting by Ahmad Fuad Osman.
A book trailer was posted on YouTube in conjunction with the launch, with the sound of firecrackers inspired by the launch-date's proximity to Chinese New Year.
It was listed as one of the 10 bestsellers for local English non-fiction for 2008 in Malaysia.

Vol 2 

Vol 2 features ten writers and was edited by Amir Muhammad.

 Shanon Shah's The Khutbah Diaries, about political Islam
 Mohamad Tajuddin Mohamad Rasdi's The Architecture of Putrajaya, about the administrative capital
 Ridhwan Saidi's Hari-Hari Terakhir Seorang Flâneur (in Malay), partly a manifesto about urban spaces
 Danny Lim's Aku, Hang & Demo, a pictorial record of street demonstrations
 Amir Muhammad's Of Jackfruit and Kings, about the monarchy
 Ann Lee's The Theme Park of Pulau Jerejak, about leprosy
 Amir Sharipuddin's Blue, Black & White: How I Survived National Service, a journal
 Yusuf Martin's Colourful Language, a critique of American influence in culture
 Andrew Ng's A Cultural History of Pontianak Films, a survey of this horror film subgenre
 Jac sm Kee's Boundary Monsters in a Time of Magic, a feminist reading of ghosts and new technology.

The cover features a detail from a digital artwork by Yee I-Lann. The launch date of 4 July 2009 was a jokey reference to the essay by Yusuf Martin.

Vol 3 

Vol 3 features five writers and was edited by Yin Shao Loong. In a departure from the norm, it was released purely as a free e-book on 16 September 2010

Notes 

Malaysian books
Matahari Books books
Malaysian non-fiction books